Thiazole tautomerase (tenI (gene)) is an enzyme with systematic name 2-(2-carboxy-4-methylthiazol-5-yl)ethyl phosphate isomerase. This enzyme catalyses the following chemical reaction

 2-[(2R,5Z)-2-carboxy-4-methylthiazol-5(2H)-ylidene]ethyl phosphate  2-(2-carboxy-4-methylthiazol-5-yl)ethyl phosphate

The enzyme catalyses the irreversible aromatization of the thiazole moiety of 2-[(2R,5Z)-2-carboxy-4-methylthiazol-5(2H)-ylidene]ethyl phosphate.

References

External links 
 

EC 5.3.99